The 1926 Lafayette Leopards football team was an American football team that represented Lafayette College as an independent during the 1926 college football season. In its third season under head coach Herb McCracken, Lafayette compiled a 9–0 record and shut out five of nine opponents. Halfback Frank Kirkleski was the team captain.

Although Alabama and Stanford have been named the 1926 national champion by most selectors, the 1926 Lafayette team was named as the national champion by one selector, Parke H. Davis. The team was ranked No. 5 in the nation in the Dickinson System ratings released in December 1926.

The team played its home games at the Fisher Stadium in Easton, Pennsylvania. Fisher Stadium opened in 1926 with a seating capacity of 13,132.

Schedule

References

Lafayette
Lafayette Leopards football seasons
College football national champions
College football undefeated seasons
Lafayette Football